David A. M. Peterson (born 18 January 1973) is an American political scientist.

He graduated from Gustavus Adolphus College and completed doctoral studies at the University of Minnesota in 2000. Peterson then taught at Texas A&M University until 2009, when he joined the Iowa State University faculty. In 2015, he succeeded Jeff Mondak and Tom Rudolph as editor of the journal Political Behavior. Peterson stepped down from as editor in 2019, and was replaced by Geoffrey Layman and Benjamin Radcliff. In 2020, Peterson was appointed to the Lucken Professorship in Political Science.

References

1973 births
Living people
American political scientists
Texas A&M University faculty
Iowa State University faculty
Gustavus Adolphus College alumni
Political science journal editors